The Edinburgh International Conference Centre (EICC) is the principal convention and conference centre in Edinburgh, Scotland.

Location

The centre is part of the masterplanned Exchange District in the west end of the city, and was designed by the architect Sir Terry Farrell, who ran the project from his Edinburgh office, opened to manage this project and other work in the Exchange.

Construction on the EICC began in March 1993 and the centre opened in 1995. It caters to around 200,000 delegates every year and generates in excess of £60m in revenue for the City of Edinburgh. An extension opened in 2013 at a cost of £85 million.

Notable events
In 1999 the annual General Assembly of the Church of Scotland was held in the EICC. The Church's Assembly Hall was being used by the Scottish Parliament at the time.

The Commonwealth Heads of Government Meeting 1997 (CHOGM) was held in the EICC. To commemorate this occasion, the Clydesdale Bank issued a special commemorative £20 note. The reverse side featured an illustration of the EICC building alongside the new Clydesdale Bank building on Lothian Road, with Edinburgh Castle in the background.

References

External links

Buildings and structures in Edinburgh
Terry Farrell buildings
1995 establishments in Scotland
Buildings and structures completed in 1995
Exhibition and conference centres in Scotland